In probability theory and statistics, the generalized multivariate log-gamma (G-MVLG) distribution is a multivariate distribution introduced by Demirhan and Hamurkaroglu in 2011. The G-MVLG is a flexible distribution. Skewness and kurtosis are well controlled by the parameters of the distribution. This enables one to control dispersion of the distribution. Because of this property, the distribution is effectively used as a joint prior distribution in Bayesian analysis, especially when the likelihood is not from the location-scale family of distributions such as normal distribution.

Joint probability density function

 

Properties

Joint moment generating function

The joint moment generating function of G-MVLG distribution is as the following:

Marginal central moments 

Marginal expected value and variance
Marginal expected value  is as the following:

Related distributions
Demirhan and Hamurkaroglu establish a relation between the G-MVLG distribution and the Gumbel distribution (type I extreme value distribution) and gives a multivariate form of the Gumbel distribution, namely the generalized multivariate Gumbel (G-MVGB) distribution.

The Gumbel distribution has a broad range of applications in the field of risk analysis. Therefore, the G-MVGB distribution should be beneficial when it is applied to these types of problems..

References

Multivariate continuous distributions
Continuous distributions